The Woman Who Loved Elvis is a 1993 American drama television film, directed by Bill Bixby and written by Rita Mae Brown, based on the 1992 novel Graced Land by Laura Kalpakian. It stars Roseanne Barr and her then-husband Tom Arnold. Also starring Cynthia Gibb, Danielle Harris, and Sally Kirkland, it was filmed in June 1992 in Ottumwa, Iowa, where Arnold was born. The film aired on ABC on April 18, 1993. It was the final television film directed by Bixby before his death in November 1993.

Cast 

 Roseanne Barr as Joyce Jackson
 Cynthia Gibb as Emily Shaw
 Tom Arnold as Jack Jackson
 Danielle Harris as Priscilla Jackson
 Kimberly Dal Santo as Lisa Marie Jackson
 Sally Kirkland as Sandee Sloop
 Joe Guzaldo as Howard Hanson
 Monica McCarthy as Dorrie
 Liz Muckley as Marge Mason
 Dottie Arnold as Old woman
 James Andelin Old man
 Patrick Clear as Ben Wilkes
 Marilyn Dodds Frank as Social worker
 Sam Derence as Surgeon
 W. Earl Brown as Pete
 Albert Flores as Justin
 Jeremy Jones as Jack Jr.
 John Duda as Paperboy

References

1993 television films
1993 films
1993 drama films
ABC Motion Pictures films
American drama television films
Films based on American novels
Films directed by Bill Bixby
Films scored by William Olvis
Films shot in Iowa
Television films based on books
1990s American films